The following is a list of New Zealand MPs who died while serving their terms.

Background
When a member dies during their term of office this generally causes a by-election, if the deceased member held an electorate seat. Under the Electoral Act 1993, a by-election is not needed when the death occurs within six months of a general election and if 75% of MPs support the postponement of the by-election. General elections may be brought forward to stay within the six-months period. Twice, in 1943 and 1969, by-elections were avoided after the deaths in election years of Paraire Karaka Paikea and Ralph Hanan by passing special acts, the By-election Postponement Act 1943 and the By-election Postponement Act 1969. When a death occurs close enough to a general election, the seat is left vacant, to be filled again at the general election.

If the deceased member held a list seat, the vacancy is filled by the next available person on their party's list.

Members who died after Parliament was dissolved after its final session are not listed here. The first time this happened was in 1855 when the 1st New Zealand Parliament was dissolved after its third session on 15 September 1855, with Alfred Christopher Picard dying two days later. Job Vile, who had represented the Manawatu electorate during the 15th New Zealand Parliament, died on 6 December 1905. This was the day of the 1905 general election, when he was defeated by John Stevens.

List of members
Key

Footnotes

Notes

References

New Zealand Parliament
Died
Lists of political office-holders in New Zealand
New Zealand